Mehdi Zatout (born January 1, 1983) is a retired French–Algerian Muay Thai kickboxer. He is an ISKA world, WMC world and WBC Muay Thai world and diamond champion.

Early life 
Zatout started Muay Thai when he was 10 years old. He was hooked instantly, and just two years later, his dedication to the “art of eight limbs” brought him to the Sit-Or camp in Pattaya, Thailand.

Over the course of his career spanning more than 20 years, Zatout would go on to travel to Thailand more than 50 times to train and compete, amassing over 100 competitive bouts under kickboxing and Muay Thai rules.

Zatout won two national titles in France, a European championship, and two world titles. He is owner of the Venum Training Camp in Thailand.

Career

International Sport Karate Association 
In 2013 Zatout won ISKA world title.

World Muaythai Council 
In 2008 and 2009 Zatout won the WMC Eroupian and world title.

WBC Muay Thai 
On September 7, 2013 Zatout won the featherweight world title.

On May 14, 2022 Zatout won the featherweight diamond title.

ONE Championship 
Zatout was next scheduled to fight for the ONE Bantamweight Kickboxing World Championship against champion Capitan Petchyindee Academy at ONE Championship: Revolution on September 24, 2021. He lost the fight by unanimous decision.

On October 22, 2022 Zatout won Asa Ten Pow by KO in first round in the ONE on Prime Video 3 and has been retired.

Championships and awards 

Muay Thai
World Boxing Council Muaythai
2013 WBC -66.7kg World Championship
2022 WBC -66.7kg Diamond Championship

World Muaythai Council
2009 WMC -66.7kg European Championship

Kickboxing
International Sport Karate Association
2013 ISKA -67kg World Championship

Kickboxing record

|-  style="background:#cfc;"
| 2022-10-22 || Win ||align=left| Asa Ten Pow || ONE on Prime Video 3 || Kuala Lumpur, Malaysia || 	TKO (Retirement) || 1 || 3:00
|-  style="background:#cfc;"
| 2022-05-14 || Win ||align=left| Saensiri JPowerRoofPhuket || Venum Fight, Rajadamnern Stadium || Bangkok, Thailand|| TKO (Punches) || 4 || 
|-
! style=background:white colspan=9 |
|-  style="background:#fbb;"
| 2021-09-24|| Loss ||align=left| Capitan Petchyindee Academy || ONE Championship: Revolution || Kallang, Singapore || Decision (Unanimous) || 5 || 3:00
|-
! style=background:white colspan=9 |
|-  style="background:#cfc;"
| 2020-08-14|| Win ||align=left| Leo Pinto || ONE Championship: No Surrender 2 || Bangkok, Thailand || Decision (Unanimous) || 3 || 3:00
|-  style="background:#cfc;"
| 2020-01-10|| Win ||align=left| Han Zihao || ONE Championship: A New Tomorrow || Bangkok, Thailand || Decision (Split) || 3 || 3:00
|-  style="background:#fbb;"
| 2018-10-06 || Loss ||align=left| Nong-O Gaiyanghadao || ONE Championship: Kingdom of Heroes || Bangkok, Thailand || Decision (Unanimous) || 3 || 3:00
|-  style="background:#fbb;"
| 2018-06-29 || Loss ||align=left| Tukkatatong Petpayatai || ONE Championship: Spirit of a Warrior || Yangon, Myanmar || Decision (Unanimous) || 3 || 3:00
|-  style="background:#fbb;"
| 2016-01-23 || Loss ||align=left| Morgan Adrar || Burning Series || Arbent, France || Decision || 3 || 3:00
|-
! style=background:white colspan=9 |
|-  style="background:#cfc;"
| 2015-11-28 || Win ||align=left| Yetkin Ozkul || Venum Victory World Series 2015 || Paris, France || Decision || 3 || 3:00
|-  style="background:#fbb;"
| 2014-09-09 || Loss ||align=left| Liam Harrison || Smash 10 || Liverpool, England || Decision || 5 || 3:00
|-
! style=background:white colspan=9 |
|-  style="background:#fbb;"
| 2014-01-25 || Loss ||align=left| Houcine Bennoui || La Ligue des Gladiateurs || Paris, France || Decision (unanimous) || 5 || 3:00
|-  style="background:#fbb;"
| 2013-10-11 || Loss ||align=left| Fabio Pinca || WARRIORS NIGHT 2 || France || Decision || 5 || 3:00
|-  style="background:#cfc;"
| 2013-09-07 || Win ||align=left| Singmanee Kaewsamrit || Millennium Team Fight  || France || Decision || 5 || 3:00
|-
! style=background:white colspan=9 |
|-  style="background:#fbb;"
| 2013-02-14 || Loss ||align=left| Sak Kaoponlek || Best Of Siam 3 || Paris, France || Decision || 3 || 3:00
|- style="background:#fbb;"
| 2012-06-14 || Loss ||align=left| Saenchai || Best of Siam || Paris, France || Decision || 5 || 3:00
|-  style="background:#fbb;"
| 2010-03-13 || Loss ||align=left| Sagetdao Petpayathai || France VS Thaïlande || Bagnolet, France || Decision || 5 || 3:00
|-  style="background:#cfc;"
| 2009-11-07 || Win ||align=left| Andy Trasher || MSA Muay Thai Premier League || Bolton, United Kingdom || Decision || 5 || 3:00
|-
! style=background:white colspan=9 |
|-  style="background:#fbb;"
| 2009-07-11 || Loss ||align=left| Houcine Bennoui || Diamond Fight World Tour 2 || Marrakech, Morocco || TKO (Referee Stoppage) ||  ||
|-  style="background:#fbb;"
| 2009-06-20 || Loss ||align=left| Mustapha Youcef || Le Grand Défi || Levallois Perret, France || Decision || 5 || 3:00
|-  style="background:#cfc;"
| 2009-03-26 || Win ||align=left| Arican || Les Stars Du Ring || Levallois Perret, France || Decision || 5 || 3:00
|-  style="background:#c5d2ea;"
| 2008-12-20 || Draw ||align=left| Amadou Ba || K1 Survivor || Paris, France || Draw || 5 || 3:00
|-  style="background:#cfc;"
| 2008-11-06 || Win ||align=left| Rit Kaewsamrit || Muay Thai || Levallois Perret, France || KO || 3 ||
|-  style="background:#cfc;"
| 2008-06-07 || Win ||align=left| Tarik Mahillon || Le choc des boxes || Paris, France || KO || 1 ||
|-  style="background:#fbb;"
| 2008-04-30 || Loss ||align=left| Andrei Kulebin || W.M.C. I-1 World GP '08, Semi Finals || Kowloon, Hong Kong || Decision (Unanimous) || 3 || 3:00
|-  style="background:#cfc;"
| 2008-04-30 || Win ||align=left| Raul Llopis || WMC I-1 World Muay Thai Grand Prix Quarter Finals || Kowloon, Hong Kong || Decision || 5 || 3:00
|-  style="background:#cfc;"
| 2007-11-29 || Win ||align=left| Charles François || Gala in Coubertin || Paris, France || TKO (referee stoppage) || 3 ||
|-  style="background:#cfc;"
| 2007-04-20 || Win ||align=left| Tanwanhek Domenlek || Le défi des champions || Levallois Perret, France || Decision || 5 || 3:00
|-  style="background:#cfc;"
| 2007-02-17 || Win ||align=left| Houcine Bennoui || La Nuit des Titans || Tours, France || Decision (Unanimous) || 5 || 3:00
|-  style="background:#cfc;"
| 2007-01-27 || Win ||align=left| Guillaume Mautz || Gala de Saumur || Saumur, France || KO (Throw) || 4 ||
|-  style="background:#fbb;"
| 2006-12-04 || Loss ||align=left| Gomenlek Tor Silchai || King's Birthday || Bangkok, Thailand || Decision || 5 || 3:00
|-  style="background:#cfc;"
| 2006-04-29 || Win ||align=left| Anthony Etcheverry || Finales Golden Cup 2006 || Paris, France || TKO (Referee Stoppage) || 3 ||
|-  style="background:#cfc;"
| 2006-03-25 || Win ||align=left| Hakim Benzouac || Championnat de France : 1/2 finale || Paris, France || TKO (Doctor Stoppage) || 5 ||
|-  style="background:#cfc;"
| 2006-02-11 || Win ||align=left| Anthony Etcheverry || Muay Thai || Vannes, France || TKO || 3 || 
|-
| colspan=9 | Legend:

External links
ONE Championship profile

References 

1983 births
Living people
French male kickboxers
Algerian male kickboxers
French Muay Thai practitioners
Featherweight kickboxers
Sportspeople from Paris
French sportspeople of Algerian descent
ONE Championship kickboxers
Muay Thai trainers